The Călacea oil field is an oil field located in Orțișoara, Timiș County. It was discovered in 1968 and developed by Petrom. It began production in 1970 and produces oil.

References

Oil fields in Romania